"The Days" is a song by Swedish DJ and record producer Avicii, with vocals by English singer Robbie Williams. The song was written by Brandon Flowers, Robbie Williams, Salem Al Fakir, Avicii, and Vincent Pontare, and was produced by Avicii, Fakir and Pontare. The song was played for the first time in Boston, with uncredited vocals by Fakir. The song was released worldwide on 3 October 2014. It was released alongside "The Nights" in The Days / Nights EP. A planned release in the United Kingdom on 23 November 2014 was cancelled.

Composition
"The Days" is written in the key of C major, at a tempo of 127 BPM. The chord structure is based on the pop punk chord progression.

Recording
The song was originally written with Vincent Pontare and Salem Al Fakir, but was meant to be a collaboration between Brandon Flowers and Avicii, with Flowers providing the vocals. However, due to Flowers' dissatisfaction with the recording, Avicii brought on a different vocalist, Robbie Williams.

Music video
An official lyric video was also released on YouTube by the official Avicii Vevo channel. In the video, an artist (later confirmed as INO), spray-paints the lyrics of "The Days" in black against a white wall. Near the end of the video, a pan-out reveals the lyrics creating a portrait of Avicii, which is subsequently covered with splashes of coloured paint by the artist.

As of February 2023, the lyric video has been viewed more than 200 million times.

Track listing

Credits and personnel
Brandon Flowers – lyrics 
Salem Al Fakir – producer
Tim Bergling – music, producer
Vincent Pontare – producer
Robbie Williams – vocals
Stuart Hawkes – mastering
Ash Pournouri – executive producer

Credits adapted from CD single.

Charts and certifications

Weekly charts

Year-end charts

Certifications

References

2014 singles
2014 songs
Avicii songs
Folktronica songs
Number-one singles in Finland
Number-one singles in Norway
Number-one singles in Sweden
Robbie Williams songs
Song recordings produced by Salem Al Fakir
Song recordings produced by Vincent Pontare
Songs written by Avicii
Songs written by Brandon Flowers
Songs written by Robbie Williams
Songs written by Salem Al Fakir
Songs written by Vincent Pontare